Markow is a surname. It may refer to:
Mischa Markow (1854–1934), pioneering Mormon missionary in Europe
Therese Ann Markow (born 1949), American physical anthropologist and ecologist
Jack Markow (1905–1983), American cartoonist